Gold in the Street (French: L'Or dans la rue ) is a 1934 French comedy film directed by Curtis Bernhardt, written by Henry Koster and Henri Decoin, and starring Danielle Darrieux.

The film's sets were designed by the art director Robert Gys.

Plot
Albert bets his friend Pierre he can seduce the first woman that Pierre might pick. The working girl Gaby happens to be the chosen. When Albert gets to know her he falls in love with her. At the same time he attempts to make a fortune by participating in a swindle about alleged "synthetic gold". But at the very day when the scheme ought to be accomplished, everything goes terribly awry and he is debunked. After that he has scarcely enough money left to buy a ticket to the United States for himself and his fiancée Gaby.

Cast 
 Albert Préjean as Albert Perret
 Danielle Darrieux as Gaby
 Raymond Cordy as Pierre
 Pierre Larquey as Tourbier
 Jean Worms as De Varville
 Vanda Gréville as Miss Bruce
 Alice Tissot as Mme Tourbier
 Suzy Delair as Madeleine
 Pierre Finaly as Achille
 Gabrielle Fontan as Pierre's mother
 Lucien Callamand as the clerk
 Georges Paulais as the customer
 Robert Dalban as the man at the railway station

References

Bibliography
 Oscherwitz, Dayna & Higgins, MaryEllen . The A to Z of French Cinema. Scarecrow Press, 2009.

External links

L'Or dans la rue at Gaumont.fr 
L'Or dans la rue at Dvdtoile

1934 films
French black-and-white films
French comedy films
1934 comedy films
Films scored by Paul Dessau
Films directed by Curtis Bernhardt
1930s French films
1930s French-language films